Francisco Javier Castaños Aragorri Urioste y Olavide, 1st Duke of Bailén (22 April 1758 – 24 September 1852) was a Spanish general and politician who excelled during the French Revolutionary Wars and the Napoleonic Wars. From July to September 1834, he served as the first president of the Senate of Spain, at that time called House of Peers.

Castaños was one of the most important military officers during the Peninsular War, reaching the position of Chair of the Regency Council of Spain and the Indies (de facto head of state) in 1810. In 1833, Queen Regent Maria Christina of the Two Sicilies, in the name of her daughter, Queen Isabella II, granted him with the title of Duke of Bailén, to honour his actions in the Peninsular War and, specially, in the Battle of Bailén, where the Napoleonic army was defeated at open field for the first time, which also caused the flight of Spain from King Joseph Bonaparte.

Biography
Castaños was born at Madrid.

Castaños is remembered for his victory over the French under Dupont, whom he surrounded and compelled to surrender at the decisive Battle of Bailen in 1808. Though just months later lead his army to a decisive defeat at the Battle of Tudela. After this he served under Wellington in several engagements, and was commander of the Spanish army, if required, to invade France in 1815.

Castaños died at Madrid in 1852.

Bibliography

External links

Bicentenary of the Battle of Bailén(in Spanish).

1758 births
1852 deaths
Military personnel from Madrid
Counts of Castaños y Aragones
101
Spanish captain generals
Spanish generals
Spanish commanders of the Napoleonic Wars
Knights of the Golden Fleece of Spain
Presidents of the Senate of Spain